The Schlüsselfelder Ship is a nef or table centrepiece in the form of a model ship, in this case a work of the German Renaissance about 1503. The carrack was made of silver-gilt in Nuremberg, Germany, possibly by Albrecht Dürer the Elder, at the request of the patrician Wilhelm Schlüsselfelder. It is displayed in the Germanisches Nationalmuseum in Nuremberg.

References 
Schürer, Ralf: "Schlüsselfelder Schiff", in: Dienst, Barbara: Faszination Meisterwerk. Dürer, Rembrandt, Riemenschneider, Ausstellungskatalog des Germanischen Nationalmuseums Nürnberg, Verlag des Germanischen Nationalmuseums, Nürnberg 2004, pp. 81–82

German Renaissance sculptures
Collections of the Germanisches Nationalmuseum
Carracks
Silver-gilt objects